Moon Base One is a young adult science fiction novel, the fourth in Hugh Walters' Chris Godfrey of U.N.E.X.A. series. It was published in the UK by Faber in 1960, in the US by Criterion Books in 1962 under the title Outpost on the Moon.

Plot summary

Thousands of young people are terminally ill as a result of the radiation produced by the lunar structures destroyed in The Domes of Pico.  In an attempt to determine whether the fall-out from the domes can have a curative effect on the disease a joint east–west mission is planned under the auspices of the newly formed United Nations EXploration Agency (UNEXA).

The mission is commanded by Chris Godfrey, accompanied by American, Morrison 'Morrey' Kant and Russian Serge Smyslov.  The 'patient' will be Tony Hale, from Aston near Birmingham (who goes on to feature in the rest of the series).  The mission starts well, but is soon in trouble when a supply rocket crashes...

External links
Moon Base One page

1960 British novels
1960 science fiction novels
Chris Godfrey of U.N.E.X.A. series
Faber and Faber books
Novels set on the Moon